The Pasoeroean Stoomtram Maatschappij, N.V. (PsSM, Dutch for Pasuruan Steam Tram Company) was a private tram company in Pasuruan on the Dutch East Indies (now East Java, Indonesia). It served passenger transport as well as goods transport of agricultural products such as sugarcane, tea and tobacco.

History

After Surabaya−Bangil−Pasuruan had been connected by Staatsspoorwegen railway line in May, 16th 1878. There was a private investor who interested to built rail line which connecting the rural part of Pasuruan to the port area. The Pasoeroean Stoomtram Maatschappij (PsSM) was founded officially in 1895 based on Notarial Deed of H.W.F.Ligtenberg at Den Haag ('s Gravenhage)  on March, 14 also Koninklijk Besluit No.19 on March 5 1895, operating as a tram company, proposed to the Government of the Dutch East Indies the construction of a rail network to solved the transport problems of the sugar mills and crops in the Pasuruan area, which hindered the export of agricultural products. The sugar mills (suikerfabrieken) which faced the problems were Sf. Kedawoeng, Sf. Bekassi Oost (Winongan), Sf. Gajam (Gayam), Sf. de Goede Hoop (Pengkol), Sf. Pleret (now ex textile factory Nebritex/Inbritex), Sf. Wonoredjo (Wonorejo) and Sf. Alkmaar (Purwosari).

After the necessary negotiations, PsSM received the concession from the Dutch East Indies Government. Started in 1893, as follows, to open a tram rail network: 
Based on Government Resolution No. 2 of March 18, 1893: 
Pasuruan - Warung Dowo (6 km) was inaugurated on May 21, 1896. 
Pasuruan - Boom (Pelabuhan) which connected to Pier for port activities. (2 km) was opened on December 27, 1896. 
Based on Government Resolution No. 37 of August 29, 1895: 
Warung Dowo - Bekasi (Winongan) which connected to Sf.Bekassie-Oost (10 km) was opened on March 26, 1897. 
Wonorejo - Bakalan (4 km) was opened on June 7, 1897. 
Warung Dowo - Wonorejo (11 km) was opened on 17 March 1899. 
Bakalan - Alkmaar (Purwosari) near market, which connected to Sf.Alkmaar (4 km) was opened on May 8, 1900. 
Based on Government Resolution No. 19 of June 17, 1911: 
Pasuruan - Gembong River (3 km) which was built for port activity opened on March 27, 1912. 
Warung Dowo - Ngempit (5 km) was opened on 1 December 1912.

Track construction

Locomotives 
 
In the beginning of the company's operation (around 1896), the PsSM imported 3 units of Type 0-4-0Tr tram engines (Type B) which were also used by Probolinggo Stoomtram Maatschappij (PbSM) (3 units) from Backer & Rueb (Machinefabriek Breda, Netherlands). However, when they were used for tough duty pulling a series of heavy sugarcane wagons, these locomotives often faced losing power (underpowered). Due to the poor performance of the engines, PsSM withdrew it from active service in 1897. After a while, PsSM imported many new of Germans Hohenzollern Locomotive Works type 0-4-0Tr  tram engines (later became B16 during Japanese occupation and DKA/PNKA era), the first batch consisting of 5 units (08-12 series) came in 1897, also all Hohenzollern locomotives were ordered through Probolinggo from Holland with the numbers listed but some interchange of locomotives took place between the Probolinggo and Pasoeroean sister systems in the early days. In addition, this private tram company also acquired a 0-6-0Tr tram engine PsSM 9 (later became type C25 No.06) of Hanomag, Germany in 1921, the rest of five were used by Probolinggo Stoomtram as its sister company, to supported their tough duty hauling heavy sugarcane wagons, as they found that their B16s weren't so powerful enough to hauling heavy sugarcane trains. The Cockerill locomotives (Type C22s) were unusual, because they had an inside frame for the first two axles and an outside frame for the third axle. This provided more space for the firebox between the wheels but required very long crank pins on the inside framed wheels of the first two axles.

The steam trams facilitated the daily commute for the working people. Therefore, the tram quickly received a good response from the population, which used at that time otherwise traditional means of transport such as horses or carts. Despite the cheap prices, the tram was considered faster than other means of transport at the time. The locomotives were used not only for passenger cars, but also for freight cars that transported sugarcane and other export products to the port and also loaded factory machinery products from De Bromo, NV. machine shop (later became PT.Bromo Steel Indonesia (PT.Bosto)) to support the operational activities of several sugar mills in and around Pasuruan Regency and another factories. De Bromo also provided steal beam manufacturing as operational support for PsSM infrastructure like rail lines.

Because it had the same track gauge as state railway Staatsspoorwegen or SS, the PsSM trains could be integrated with SS main line and crops were could be transported through Tanjung Tembikar Harbor of Pasuruan or transported directly to other cities without the need for unloading. For another option, the crops which were transported could be stored in advance to the government warehouses located just north of Pasuruan Station (Pasoeroean SS) (now located at Maluku street and Martadinata street via google maps).

Closure 
Over time, the tram was partially shut down by the PsSM, because it was not able to compete with the increasing road transport due to the ageing of rail vehicles and infrastructure. Some sections were closed during the Japanese occupation. In the decade of 1970-1980, the construction of roads was carried out on a large scale along with the increase of road traffic. The decommissioning took place as follows: 
Pasuruan-Boom (Pier) was shut down 1943/1944 by the Japanese 
Warungdowo - Ngempit was decommissioned in 1943/1944 by the Japanese 
Warungdowo - Wonorejo was shut down in 1976 
Pasuruan - Winongan was shut down by the Japanese, but later put back into service, because many sugar factories were still in operation. However, on February 1, 1988, this route was finally shut down.

References 

Defunct railway companies of Indonesia
Tram transport
Defunct companies of the Dutch East Indies